Kenneth Selmon (born August 27, 1996) is an American track and field athlete who specializes in the 400 metres hurdles. He won the USA Outdoor Championship in 2018 and represented his country at the 2018 Athletics World Cup in London, where he won the 400 metres hurdles.

Early life 
Selmon attended high school at Pace Academy in Atlanta, GA. He was a 7-time GHSA state champion in track and field and 3-time all-american in the 400 metres hurdles. While in high school, Selmon placed third at the 2013 World Youth Championships in the 400mH and won the 2014 National Championship.

Collegiate career 
Selmon attended the University of North Carolina where he competed in indoor and outdoor track and field. While at UNC, Selmon won two ACC Championships in the 400 metres hurdles and placed 4th, 3rd, and 2nd in the NCAA Division I National Championships in the 400mH in 2016, 2017, and 2018. His college personal record of 48.12, which he ran at the NCAA Division I Championships in 2018, is the fastest in UNC history. While in college, Selmon competed in the 2016 Olympic Team Trials where he placed 7th. After graduating from UNC, Selmon won the 2018 USATF Outdoor Championships in the 400 metres hurdles.

Professional career 
After graduating college, Selmon represented the United States at the 2018 London Athletics World cup which he won.

Kenny Selmon signed a professional contract with Spyder Korea in 2019.

Selmon qualified for the 2021 U.S. Olympic team in the 400m hurdles.

International competitions

National titles
USA Outdoor Track and Field Championships
400 m hurdles: 2018
USATF U20 Outdoor Championships
400 m hurdles: 2015

References 

Living people
1996 births
People from Mableton, Georgia
Track and field athletes from Atlanta
American male hurdlers
American male sprinters
USA Outdoor Track and Field Championships winners
African-American male track and field athletes
North Carolina Tar Heels men's track and field athletes
Athletes (track and field) at the 2020 Summer Olympics
Olympic track and field athletes of the United States
21st-century African-American sportspeople